Matthew Chase Brabham (born 25 February 1994) is an Australian-American racing driver. He competes full-time in Indy Lights, driving the No. 83 for Andretti Autosport. From 2015 to 2021, he was a regular in the Stadium Super Trucks, where he is a three-time series champion with titles in 2018, 2019 and 2021. He has also won championships in the Road to Indy ladder with the 2012 U.S. F2000 and 2013 Pro Mazda Championships.

Brabham is a third-generation racing driver; he is the son of Geoff Brabham and the grandson of three-time Formula One World Champion Sir Jack Brabham.

Racing career

Early career
Born in Boca Raton, Florida, Brabham and his family moved to Australia in his youth. Much of Brabham's early exposure to racing came via watching his mother's jet ski competitions as he rarely attended his father and grandfather's auto races.

He started racing karts in 2001 at the age of 7, competing in the Australian 'Midget' class. In 2007, he won the Queensland State 'Rookie' Title, following up by winning both the New South Wales and Queensland State Junior National Light Titles and finishing second in the Australian and Melbourne City Titles in 2008. A year later, Brabham won the 'Junior Rotax' Young Guns Title, before graduating to Formula Ford racing towards the end of the year. In 2010, he competed in the Australian Formula Ford Championship with the CAMS Rising Star Team before moving to the Victorian State Formula Ford Series and the Australian National Championship with Sonic Motor Racing Services. In the state series, he won eight out of 12 races, including seven in a row, while he scored two wins, two runner-up finishes, and a pole position in the national division.

Road to Indy
For 2012, Brabham joined Cape Motorsports with Wayne Taylor Racing, to compete in the U.S. F2000 National Championship. Brabham won the title over his teammate Spencer Pigot by seven points, capturing four wins from 11 podium finishes in the fourteen race season. In doing so he won a $350,000 USD scholarship through the Road to Indy to race in the Star Mazda Championship in 2013.

He signed to drive the No. 27 car for Andretti Autosport for the 2013 Star Mazda Championship. Brabham won the championship with two races remaining, capturing a series-record 11th win in his rookie season. Brabham's title secured a scholarship to compete in Indy Lights in 2014.

Brabham remained with Andretti Autosport to challenge for the Indy Lights title in 2014. He won one race and collected four podiums and 10 top-fives in 14 races to finish fourth in the overall standings. Brabham attributed his lower points finish than hoped to his lack of experience, having progressed through three levels of the Road to Indy in as many years, and his difficulties in adjusting to the series' use of Cooper Tires after mainly racing with Firestone. Financial issues prevented him from completing a second season in 2015. He won 18 of 47 career Road to Indy races (approximately 38.3 percent) from 2012 to 2015, the second highest winning percentage in the ladder's history behind Kyle Kirkwood's 62.5 percent .

In October 2021, Brabham rejoined Andretti's Indy Lights programme for the Chris Griffis Memorial Test at Indianapolis, during which he set the tenth-best time. Three months later, he formally committed to the 2022 Indy Lights season with the team; at 28 years of age, he was the oldest driver in the field. He won the season opener at St. Petersburg after passing teammate Christian Rasmussen, who ran out of fuel, on the penultimate lap.

Formula E and IndyCar

In November 2014, Brabham competed in the second round of the inaugural Formula E world championship in Putrajaya, Malaysia. He replaced Charles Pic for Andretti Autosport. At age 20 Brabham became the youngest driver to compete in Formula E.

In 2016, Brabham made his Indianapolis 500 debut, driving the No. 61 for Pirtek Team Murray. He qualified 26th and finished 22nd. Although he has not run another IndyCar race , he remains involved as the driver of IndyCar's two-seater for guests at race weekends.

Stadium Super Trucks

In 2015, Brabham made his Stadium Super Trucks debut at Honda Indy Toronto; Brabham, who was at the track working as a driver coach, received the opportunity to race after Paul Tracy became unavailable due to television obligations. He finished sixth and fourth in the weekend's two races. Later in the year, he competed at the Gold Coast 600, Valvoline Raceway, and the Sydney 500 events, recording runner-up finishes at Gold Coast and Valvoline.

Brabham began racing in the series on a full-time basis in 2016. In June, he swept the Detroit Belle Isle Grand Prix rounds. He later joined Team Traxxas, driving the No. 83 alongside Sheldon Creed. Brabham scored his third win of the season when he held off Creed at Toronto. He finished second in the 2016 standings, 75 points behind Creed, with three wins and 16 podiums.

For the 2017 season, he acquired sponsorship from Safecraft Safety Equipment. His first win of the year came in the Firestone Grand Prix of St. Petersburg, where he became the first non-Australian SST race winner, followed by victories at the Grand Prix of Long Beach, Hidden Valley Raceway, Beijing National Stadium, and Watkins Glen International. He finished runner up to Paul Morris by one point.

He continued in the series for a fourth year in 2018. His first win of the season came at Adelaide Street Circuit's third race, where he capitalised on Robby Gordon entering the final corner too wide on the last lap. Further triumphs came at Long Beach, Barbagallo Raceway, Texas Motor Speedway, Road America, and Sydney Motorsport Park. Brabham battled with Gavin Harlien for the championship throughout the season, and a victory at the season-ending 2019 Race of Champions clinched him the 2018 title. His six wins led the series in 2018.

Brabham opened the 2019 season by winning the second race of the Circuit of the Americas weekend despite suffering from a foodborne illness the previous night. After winning again at Long Beach when he beat Creed, Brabham went on a three-race string of runner-up finishes; his two second-place runs at Toronto earned him that weekend's overall win. Additional wins came at Mid-Ohio Sports Car Course and Portland International Raceway. In the series' Australian return at Gold Coast to end the year, Brabham was involved in last-lap incidents in both races: in the first round, he spun race leader Toby Price in turn 11 that led to Gordon winning, while he dodged contact between Morris and Cole Potts to win the second. He finished the year with a series-high six wins and 13 podiums to clinch his second straight title.

While the 2020 campaign did not track standings due to the COVID-19 pandemic, Brabham won twice at Adelaide and Road America. The Adelaide victory, which came in the second of three races that weekend, saw him beat Gordon to the finish by .0351 seconds. A third championship came in 2021 as he finished on the podium in all ten races with a sweep of the second Mid-Ohio weekend. From the 2019 Gold Coast round and across the next two seasons, Brabham was the fastest driver in every qualifying session until the 2021 season finale at Long Beach where Gordon snapped his streak at five.

Although Brabham did not commit to a full 2022 season due to Indy Lights, he continued to make occasional starts as SST's prize money structure provides him with a sustainable salary. His first race weekend as a part-time SST driver was at Long Beach.

Supercars
In 2017, Brabham returned to Australia to race in the Supercars Championship, making his debut at the 2017 Perth SuperSprint for Lucas Dumbrell Motorsport in place of Taz Douglas. He was scheduled to race as a co-driver for the Team 18 team in the 2018 Endurance Cup but this drive was taken by Jason Bright.

Sports car racing
In 2017, Brabham, Bill Hynes and Alexandre Prémat competed in the Utah Motorsports Campus 6 Hour Enduro, where they won EXR Racing Series class and finished tenth overall.

Brabham entered the Bathurst 12 Hour in 2018, driving a BMW M4 GT4 that he shared with Tony Longhurst and Aaron Seton. The three dominated the Class C to win. Later in the year, he entered the Pirelli World Challenge's GT class, driving for CRP Racing at Portland International Raceway. He followed this up with another appearance at the final round in Utah.

On November 7, 2021, he made his Trans-Am Series debut at Circuit of the Americas a memorable one. While filling in for series regular Chris Dyson, in the No. 20 Ford Mustang, he caught and passed 7-time series champion Ernie Francis Jr. in the final 50 feet of the last lap for the win.

Personal life
Brabham's family is heavily involved in motorsports, with father Geoff being a former CART driver while mother Roseina is a jet ski champion. He has raced against his parents in historic motorsport and jet skis. Grandfather Jack Brabham won three Formula One World Championships, while uncle David has won championships in sports cars.

His girlfriend Kimberly Bogle has worked as a racing promotional model.

Racing record

Karting career summary

Career summary

U.S. F2000 National Championship
(key)

Pro Mazda Championship
(key)

Indy Lights
(key) (Races in bold indicate pole position) (Races in italics indicate fastest lap) (Races with L indicate a race lap led) (Races with * indicate most race laps led)

Complete Formula E results
(key) (Races in bold indicate pole position; races in italics indicate fastest lap)

IndyCar Series

Indianapolis 500

Complete S5000 results

Stadium Super Trucks
(key) (Bold – Pole position. Italics – Fastest qualifier. * – Most laps led.)

 The race was abandoned after Matt Mingay suffered serious injuries in a crash on lap three.
 Standings were not recorded by the series for the 2020 season.

Supercars Championship results

Complete Bathurst 12 Hour results

Pirelli World Challenge results

Trans-Am Series results

References

External links
 
 
 
 

1994 births
Living people
Sportspeople from Boca Raton, Florida
Sportspeople from the Gold Coast, Queensland
Racing drivers from Florida
Racing drivers from Queensland
Matthew
Formula Ford drivers
Indy Pro 2000 Championship drivers
Indy Lights drivers
Australian IndyCar Series drivers
Formula E drivers
U.S. F2000 National Championship drivers
Indianapolis 500 drivers
Stadium Super Trucks drivers
Formula Renault BARC drivers
Wayne Taylor Racing drivers
Andretti Autosport drivers